The SAFA Women's League, known as Hollywoodbets Super League for sponsorship reasons, is the top flight of women's association football in South Africa. The competition is run by the South African Football Association.

History

Inter-Provincial Women’s Championship (1976–1987)
Women's football started in 1976 by founding an Inter-Provincial Championship until 1987. Natal United FC have a record of 9 championships.

Sasol Women’s National League (2009–2019)
The Sasol Women's League is a provincial women's football league which was formed in 2009 when Sasol and the South African Football Association (SAFA) went into partnership for women's football in South Africa. The league comprises the champions of the nine provinces to play the National Championship and now the Hollywoodbets Super League.

SAFA Women's League (2019–present)
The Hollywoodbets Super League was formed in 2019. The league comprises 12 teams that won promotion from their respective Sasol Women's Provincial League. The champion earns automatic entry into the CAF Women's Champions League.

Champions
The list of champions and runners-up:

Most successful clubs

Sponsorships

During the beginning of the 2021–22 season, South African Football Association announced that they secured a deal with Hollywoodbets. The deal is worth about R17 million, with the winner receiving R2 million while runners up receive R1 million. They also sponsor the awards at the end of the season, giving away prize money of R50,000 to the player of the season, young player of the season, coach of the season as well as top goal score. The deal is set to be a 3-year deal.

Broadcasting 
SABC are currently the only broadcaster for SAFA Women's League. They broadcaster matches throughout their three channels: SABC 1, SABC 3 and SABC Sport. They only broadcast two matches during the weekend.

References

External links
Official website

 
Sports leagues established in 2009
2009 establishments in South Africa
Professional sports leagues in South Africa
Women's soccer in South Africa
Women's association football leagues in Africa
Women